Santa Rosa de Sucumbios is an Ecuadorian town in the province of Sucumbíos. It is also known as Santa Rosa de Yanamaru and can even have some other names.

It was brought to the world stage for being the place where FARC commander Raúl Reyes died in the hands of the Colombian Air Force sparking a regional diplomatic crisis in 2008.

Populated places in Sucumbíos Province